was a Japanese daimyō (feudal lord) of the mid-Edo period, who ruled the Hasunoike Domain in Hizen Province (modern-day Saga Prefecture).

Naooki received the title of Kai no Kami in 1750.

References
 Naooki on Nekhet's "World Nobility" site (14 September 2007)
 Monument to Nabeshima Naooki (18 September 2007)

1730 births
1757 deaths
Tozama daimyo
Nabeshima clan